Brădești may refer to several places in Romania:

 Brădești, Dolj, a commune in Dolj County
 Brădești, Harghita, a commune in Harghita County
 Brădești, a village in Lupșa Commune, Alba County
 Brădești, a village in Râmeț Commune, Alba County
 Brădești, a village in Vinderei Commune, Vaslui County
 Brădești (Jiu), a river in Dolj County
 Brădești (Târnava Mare), a river in Harghita County

See also 
 Brădet (disambiguation)
 Brădetu (disambiguation)
 Brădățel (disambiguation)
 Brădeanca (disambiguation)